Spider Lake is a lake that is located east of Horne Lake.

See also
List of lakes of British Columbia

References

Alberni Valley
Lakes of Vancouver Island
Alberni Land District